is a 1957 Japanese drama film directed by Heinosuke Gosho.

Plot
Kiyoshi Yoshida is a 9 years old boy. The boy loves to draw and he has some talent, but his teacher is worried because he draws only in black and yellow (that's where the title is from), which can mean according to color psychology that the child has no parents or is unhappy in his family. Then we learn that he has both parents but his father - Ichiro - came back from China just the previous year after 8 years in prisoner-of-war camp.
Action moves back in time to show us first the happy time when Kiyoshi was living with his mother, and awaiting father's return. And then a harsh reality after that when his father has issues to adapt to society, finding work with his skills being obsolete. He also has issues with accepting his son's hobbies that include love for animals (and father hates rats after the prison) and art, as the father thinks he should focus on more scientific subjects, that can give him better job in the future.
Also Kiyoshi is jealous of his mother, who now doesn't spend all her time with him, especially after she gives birth to a daughter. All that makes Kiyoshi unhappy. He becomes closer with his teacher and his best friends adopted mother. He even asks her if she wouldn't like to adopt him as his family doesn't love him anymore. After another conflict when Kiyoshi is blamed for everything he decides to run away from home. His parents finally realize that he might feel left out and decide to give him more of their time and love. When the boy comes back they all say "i'm sorry" and hug each other. Some time later we can see whole family happy together and Kiyoshi drawing with many colors.

Cast
Chikage Awashima as Machiko Yoshida
Kinuyo Tanaka as Yukiko Mataumoto
Kōji Shitara as Kiyoshi Yoshida
Yūnosuke Itō as Ichirō Yoshida
Yoshiko Kuga
Chōko Iida
Yoichi Numata

Awards
 15th Golden Globe Awards
Won: Best Foreign Language Film

References

External links

1957 films
1950s Japanese-language films
Films directed by Heinosuke Gosho
Japanese drama films